The Bible Presbyterian Church is an American Protestant denomination in the Calvinist tradition.

History

Origin
The Bible Presbyterian Church was formed in 1937, predominantly through the efforts of such conservative Presbyterian clergymen as Carl McIntire, J. Oliver Buswell and Allan MacRae. Francis Schaeffer was the first minister to be ordained in the new denomination.  The First General Synod of the Bible Presbyterian Church was held in 1938 in Collingswood, New Jersey.

The Bible Presbyterian Church broke from the Orthodox Presbyterian Church in 1937, the latter formed slightly earlier in 1936 and a continuation of the Presbyterian Church of America (not to be confused with the similar but later Presbyterian Church in America). The name had to be changed because of a successful lawsuit in civil court by the mainline denomination regarding name infringement – a trademark-violation issue.  After the conservative faction had left the Presbyterian Church in the United States of America (PCUSA), considerable dissension became apparent among the conservatives themselves, and it became evident that there were two groups within the Orthodox Presbyterian Church. The first group was more closely bound to traditional modes of worship, theological formulations, and the like. This group held to the classic formulations of Reformed theology (as mediated through the Westminster Confession and the Catechisms) and piety, thus forming an "orthodox" faction.

The other faction espoused a conservatism that showed a more keen interest in cultural and political matters, and saw the actions of the PCUSA as symptomatic of a rejection of long-held principles of conservative Christianity by much of the larger American society.  This group was essentially fundamentalist in nature, and became associated with the "Bible" faction. McIntire laid the basis for much of what was to come to be called the "Christian right" in American religion and politics.

Two main issues made the existence of these factions within the Orthodox Presbyterian Church evident. The first had to do with a classic Reformed piety over against a piety of fundamentalism. It came down to a conflict over the use of alcoholic beverages. The "orthodox" side condemned drunkenness, but nevertheless did not agree that Scripture required Christians to totally abstain from drinking alcoholic beverages, while the "Bible" side asserted that the Bible prohibited the consumption of alcohol entirely (see also Christianity and alcohol).

The second issue was over faithfulness to covenant Theology versus the toleration of dispensationalism. Those on the "Bible" side had come to tolerate, and even use, the popular Scofield Reference Bible whose notes taught the theological system called dispensationalism, rather than covenant theology historically held by most Calvinist churches. Scofield's notes were under considerable criticism by faculty members of Westminster Theological Seminary, who led the "orthodox" faction. Historic premillennialism was tolerated within the Orthodox Presbyterian Church, yet the dispensational form of premillennialism was considered to be serious error. Those who came to call themselves "Bible Presbyterians" saw the serious criticisms against Scofield's notes as a swipe against historic premillennialism itself, rather than merely the dispensational form of premillennialism, and wanted the freedom to use the Scofield Reference Bible. The formal exodus of Bible Presbyterian churches came about in 1938, only two years after the forming of the Orthodox Presbyterian Church, immediately after the failure of Rev. Milo F. Jamison, a dispensationalist, to be elected Moderator of the General Assembly.  The split was not on unkind terms, as was the case with the original split with the PCUSA. The Bible Presbyterian Church has always maintained the unity of the covenant of grace (a decidedly non-Dispensational position), and, in later years, passed resolutions against Dispensationalism in its annual Synod meetings.

First split
From 1955 to 1956, a fairly acrimonious split occurred in the Bible Presbyterian Church, resulting in the Bible Presbyterian Church Collingswood Synod and the Bible Presbyterian Church Columbus Synod.

While the Bible Presbyterian Church Collingswood Synod remained under the influence of McIntire, the BPC Columbus Synod, which included such men as Francis Schaeffer and Jay E. Adams would eventually move beyond its Bible Presbyterian Church heritage and eventually would take the name the Evangelical Presbyterian Church in 1961 (which is not to be confused with the current denomination of the same name, founded in 1981). In 1965, the Evangelical Presbyterian Church merged with the Reformed Presbyterian Church, General Synod, a denomination of "new light" Covenanter descent, to form the Reformed Presbyterian Church, Evangelical Synod (RPCES). The RPCES would eventually merge with the Presbyterian Church in America in 1982.

Shortly before the split, the Bible Presbyterian Church had established Covenant College and Covenant Theological Seminary, both of which would be supported by the BPC Columbus Synod/Evangelical Presbyterian Church and both would follow the Evangelical Presbyterian Church into first the RPCES and then the PCA.

Second split
The remaining synod retained the name Bible Presbyterian Church.  The group experienced another split in 1979; the American Presbyterian Church left the BPC over roughly the same concerns that led to the original OPC/BPC split decades earlier.

Third split
On March 28, 2008, the South Atlantic Presbytery voted by a wide margin to disassociate from the Bible Presbyterian Synod, in opposition to formal relations recently established between the Synod and the Orthodox Presbyterian Church. The presbytery took the name Faith Presbytery, Bible Presbyterian Church.

Recent history
Today the North American body has 33 congregations. Bible Presbyterians do not have synod-controlled boards for missions and education, but annually approve independent agencies for mission work, as well as colleges and seminaries.

Doctrine
The Westminster Confession of Faith, Larger Catechism and Shorter Catechism was adopted in the first Bible Presbyterian Synod in 1938. It agrees with the original manuscript of the Confession. The denomination describes itself as a confessional church which believes in historic Calvinism.

Demographics
The denomination comprises 33 churches mostly in the United States and 1 church in Alberta, Canada and 4 presbyteries. These presbyteries are the Great Western Presbytery, the Eastern Presbytery, the Great Lakes Presbytery, and the Florida Presbytery. The highest governing body is the Synod.

General Synod

References

External links
Bible Presbyterian Church
Far Eastern Bible College
Western Reformed Seminary
"Machen’s Warrior Children" by John Frame

Presbyterian denominations established in the 20th century
Presbyterian denominations in the United States
Christian organizations established in 1938
Collingswood, New Jersey
1938 establishments in New Jersey
Presbyterian denominations in Canada
Fundamentalist denominations
Conservatism in the United States